Saint-Cyprien is a commune in the Pyrénées-Orientales department in southern France.

Geography

History 
In the 20th century Saint-Cyprien was the site of a camp housing some 70,000 Republican escapees from Spain at the end of the Spanish Civil War. They were held in very poor conditions, in open spaces enclosed by barbed wire, from which they were not allowed to leave.
During the Second World War it was used to intern people before they were sent to extermination camps.

Government and politics

Mayors

Population and society

Population

Sports 

The main spectator sport in the town is Rugby league, while surfing, snorkeling and boat racing are also popular.

See also
Communes of the Pyrénées-Orientales department

References

Communes of Pyrénées-Orientales
Populated coastal places in France